Cumbria Constabulary is the territorial police force in England covering Cumbria. As of September 2017, the force had 1,108 police officers, 535 police staff, 93 police community support officers, and 86 special constables.

There are significant areas of isolated and rural community, and the county has one of the smallest visible minority ethnic populations in the country at under 3.0%. Each year Cumbria, which incorporates the Lake District National Park, attracts over 23 million visitors from all over the world (46 times the local population).

The Chief Constable is Michelle Skeer.  The headquarters of the force are at Carleton Hall, Penrith.

History 
Cumberland and Westmorland Constabulary was formed in 1856.  In 1947 this force absorbed Kendal Borough Police.  Less than 20 years later this amalgamated force absorbed Carlisle City Police to form a force broadly the same as today's force called the Cumberland, Westmorland and Carlisle Constabulary. In 1965, it had an establishment of 652 and an actual strength of 617. In 1967 the force name was changed to Cumbria Constabulary.

In 1974 the force's boundaries were expanded to include the new non-metropolitan county of Cumbria, in particular Furness and Sedbergh Rural District.

The Home Secretary proposed on 6 February 2006 to merge it with Lancashire Constabulary.  These proposals were accepted by both forces on 25 February and the merger would have taken place on 1 April 2007. However, in July 2006, the Cumbria and Lancashire forces decided not to proceed with the merger because the Government could not remedy issues with the differing council tax precepts.

Chief constables
Cumbria Constabulary (1967)
 19681980 : William Cavey
 19801987 : Barry David Keith Price
 1988-1991 Sir Leslie Sharp
 19911997 : Alan Elliott
 19972001 : Colin Phillips
 20012007 : Michael Baxter
 20072012 : Craig Thomas Mackey
 20122013 Stuart Hyde
 20142018 Jerry Graham
 2018present : Michelle Skeer

Officers killed in the line of duty

The Police Roll of Honour Trust and Police Memorial Trust list and commemorate all British police officers killed in the line of duty. Since its establishment in 1984, the Police Memorial Trust has erected 50 memorials nationally to some of those officers.

 Thomas Jardine was unlawfully killed during election riots near the Market Cross in Carlisle. On the night of 29 June 1841 he was struck with a sailor's 'Life Preserver' a lead weighted whalebone and died on the morning of 30th. Two men stood trial for murder, one was convicted of manslaughter and the other acquitted. His assailant was transported to Van Dieman's Land for life. Thomas was buried in Christ Church on Botchergate in the city and lies in an unmarked grave.
Constable James Armstrong died on 30 September 1847 making his way back at night from Pooley Bridge to his town of Keswick. He fell over a crag having got disorientated in the dark  having lost his way.
On 3 July 1915, Reserve Police Constable Andrew Johnstone was on duty near Carlisle railway station when he reported to his sergeant that he was feeling ill. He was told to make his way home, but he never arrived and was found drowned in a dammed river in Denton Holme. 
The force's first, and to date only, murder of an officer occurred on 10 February 1965. Constable George William Russell, aged 36, was fatally shot when, unarmed and knowing that colleagues had already been fired on, he confronted an armed suspect and called upon him to surrender at the railway station in Kendal. Russell was posthumously awarded the Queen's Police Medal for gallantry and a memorial plaque has been unveiled on a wall at Carlisle Cathedral.
 PC Keith Easterbrook (died 3 June 1993, aged 36) was fatally injured in a road traffic accident, while assisting in a vehicle pursuit, when a van he was overtaking pulled out and collided with his police motorcycle, on the A595 near Workington.
 PC William "Bill" Barker was killed whilst on duty on 20 November 2009. At night during severe weather and flooding across the county, the officer was directing motorists to safety off Northside Bridge, Workington, which was in a dangerous condition, when the bridge was destroyed by the flood and he was swept away and killed, his body found on a beach at Allonby that afternoon. Barker had completed 25 years police service and was a traffic officer attached to the Roads Policing Unit based at Workington; he had won a number of awards during his service.
PC Nick Dumphreys was killed on duty on 26 January 2020, When his vehicle crashed whilst responding to an emergency call in the Carlisle area. PC Dumphreys was part of Cumbria Constabulary's road policing unit. An investigation into his death is ongoing.

Organisation 
In terms of operational policing the force is divided into two commands - the Territorial Policing Command and the Crime Command, each headed by a Chief Superintendent.

Territorial Policing Command

This command is further divided into three geographic Territorial Policing Areas (TPAs) to cover the county, an operational support section and a command and control section.  Each TPA is led by a Superintendent and is further divided into districts and then teams for the purposes of neighbourhood policing.  The major elements of the Territorial Policing Command are as follows:

North Territorial Policing Area 

Responsible for neighbourhood and response policing across the following geographic areas:
 Carlisle District
 Eden District

South Territorial Policing Area 

Responsible for neighbourhood and response policing across the following geographic areas:
Barrow Borough District
South Lakeland District

West Territorial Policing Area 

Responsible for neighbourhood and response policing across the following geographic areas
 Allerdale District
 Copeland District

Operational Support 

Within this section are force wide units which support the TPAs or units from the Crime Command, or provide a specialist service:
 Roads Policing                             
 Firearms
 Dog section
 PSG
 Civil Contingencies
 Collision Investigation
 Firearms Licensing
 Safety Camera/CTO

Command & Control 

Within this section is the Command and Control Room (dispatch), including the Force Incident Manager (FIM) and the call taking centre.

Crime Command
This command is responsible for significant investigations and is predominantly staffed by detectives.  The command is divided as follows:

 Intelligence 
 Force Intelligence Bureau
 Intelligence Analysis
 Area Intelligence Units
 Operations
 Public Protection Units
 CID Volume Crimes
 Force Major Investigations
 Safeguarding Hub
 Forensics

Collaborations
Cumbria Constabulary is a partner in the following collaboration:
 North West Police Underwater Search & Marine Unit

PEEL inspection 2022
His Majesty's Inspectorate of Constabulary and Fire & Rescue Services (HMICFRS) conducts a periodic police effectiveness, efficiency and legitimacy (PEEL) inspection of each police service's performance. In its latest PEEL inspection, Cumbria Constabulary was rated as follows:

See also 
 Cumbria Police and Crime Commissioner
 Law enforcement in the United Kingdom
 List of law enforcement agencies in the United Kingdom, Crown Dependencies and British Overseas Territories
 PC John Kent - The first black British police officer, who served with the then Carlisle City Police between 1837 and 1844

Footnotes

External links 

 
 Cumbria at HMICFRS

Police forces of England
Constabulary
1856 establishments in England
Organizations established in 1856